Rampura is a town and Nagar palika, near Neemuch town in the Neemuch district of the Indian state of Madhya Pradesh. Rampura was founded by Rama bhil. Rama was Sardar but after the defeat against Chandrawats of Mewar, the town of Rampura was under their control until the independence of India.

Demographics
 India census, Rampura had a population of 17,761. Males constitute 52% of the population and females 48%; 14% of the population is under 6 years of age. Rampura has an average literacy rate of 64%, higher than the national average of 59.5%: male literacy is 75%, and female literacy is 53%

References

Cities and towns in Neemuch district